Falange Española de las JONS (Auténtica) (FE–JONS(A)) was a falangist political party, split from Spanish Falange of the JONS, which contested both the 1977 and 1979 general elections.

References

Falangist parties
Far-right political parties in Spain
1976 establishments in Spain
Political parties established in 1976
1980 disestablishments in Spain
Political parties disestablished in 1980
Fascist parties in Spain
National syndicalism